Peter Alexander McAlister (11 July 1869 – 10 May 1938) was an Australian cricketer who played in eight Test matches from 1904 to 1909.

His undemocratic appointment as vice-captain-cum-treasurer of the Australian cricket team in England in 1909 irrupted latent animus between the Australian Board of Control for International Cricket and its players.  An unpopular choice, McAlister was forced to brood his way through the tour after player-appointed manager Frank Laver declined to assist him.  Two years later, accordingly, the Board unilaterally repealed the players' informal right to choose their own manager.  It was this which motivated the Big Six, supported by the South Australian Cricket Association and some disgruntled members of the Melbourne Cricket Club, to pull out of the 1912 Triangular Tournament.

External links

Victorian Premier Cricket Profile

1869 births
1938 deaths
Australia Test cricketers
Victoria cricketers
Australia national cricket team selectors
Australian cricketers
Cricketers from Melbourne
Australian cricket administrators
People from Williamstown, Victoria